The National Radical Camp refers to at least three groups that are fascist, far-right, and ultranationalist Polish organisations with doctrines stemming from pre-World War II nationalist ideology.

The current incarnation revived in 1993 is a far-right movement in Poland much like its historical predecessors. It has often been described as fascist and sometimes as neo-Nazi. As of 2012 it is registered as a common-interest association.

The ONR considers itself an ideological descendant of the 1930s-era National Radical Camp, an ultranationalist, patriotic, and antisemitic political movement which existed in the pre-World War II Second Polish Republic, an illegal Polish anti-communist, and nationalist political party formed on 14 April 1934 mostly by the youth radicals who left the National Party of the National Democracy movement.

The Falanga National Radical Camp, RNR-Falanga or ONR-Falanga colloquially, was a minor Polish third position political grouping of the 1930s, as was National Radical Camp ABC or ONR-ABC for short following the split of the original party in 1934. "Falanga" is Polish for "phalanx", "ABC" refers to a newspaper printed by the organisation at the time.

First incarnation (1934)
The party was influenced by the ideas of Italian Fascism. It rejected parliamentary democracy and called for the construction of a "national state," based on the principles of hierarchy, one-person leadership, and elimination of national minorities from public life.

Dominated by youth, National Radical Camp was an outgrowth of the Endecja movement, an ultra-nationalist movement that had arisen in the 1920s. The emergence of the National Radical Camp was part of broader movement of the Polish right toward radicalization in the 1930s. Virulently antisemitic and eliminationist, ONR's members were responsible for an increase in antisemitic violence after 1935.

The party was created on the insistence of former members of the Camp of Great Poland (Obóz Wielkiej Polski), including Jan Mosdorf, Tadeusz Gluziński and Henryk Rossman. It supported "class solidarity," nationalization of foreign and Jewish-owned companies and introduction of antisemitic laws.

The ONR was mostly supported by students and other groups of urban youth. ONR openly encouraged anti-Jewish pogroms, and became the main force in the organization of attacks against Jews. It organized fighting squads, attacked Jews and leftist politicians, destroyed Jewish property, and provoked clashes with the police. Because of its involvement in boycott of Jewish-owned stores, as well as numerous attacks on left-wing worker demonstrations, the ONR was outlawed after three months of existence, in July 1934. Several leaders were interned in the Bereza Kartuska Detention Camp, where the organization split into two separate factions: the ONR-Falanga (Ruch Narodowo-Radykalny) led by Bolesław Piasecki, and the ONR-ABC (Obóz Narodowo-Radykalny) formed around the ABC journal and led by Henryk Rossman. Both organizations were officially illegal.

During World War II
During World War II, both organizations created underground resistance organizations: ONR-ABC was transformed into Grupa Szańca (Rampart Group), whose military arm became the Związek Jaszczurczy (Lizard Union), while the ONR-Falanga created the Konfederacja Narodu (Confederation of the Nation). They were not supportive of the mainstream Polish Underground State related to the Polish government in exile. During the German occupation of Poland, many of the former ONR activists belonged to National Armed Forces resistance groups. After World War II, the forced exile of many ONR members was made permanent by the newly created Polish People's Republic, which branded them enemies of the state.

Falanga

Formation and ideology
The RNR-Falanga was formed in the spring of 1935 following a split by members of the National Radical Camp held in Detention Camp Bereza Kartuska. Adopting the name of Oboz Narodowo-Radykalny (National Radical Camp), it soon became known as Falanga after the title of its journal (the rival group would also soon be named after its own journal, thus becoming known as National Radical Camp-ABC).

The Falanga was led by Bolesław Piasecki and advocated a 'Catholic totalitarianism' inspired by Spanish Falangism. However, although clearly derived from Falangism, it has been argued that their Catholicism was even more central than that of the Spanish group and indeed their pronouncement that "God is the highest form of man" recalled the religious fanaticism of Corneliu Zelea Codreanu. The group is widely considered to have been a fascist movement. Harshly critical of capitalism and supportive of removing citizenship rights from Poland's Jews it presented itself as the vanguard of the opposition to Józef Piłsudski.

Development
Largely based on university campuses, the Falanga followed a policy of anti-Semitism and although it had few members, from its power bases in schools it attempted to launch attacks on Jewish students and businesses. Left-wing activists were also as part of this violent activity.

The group soon came under scrutiny from the Polish government. Indeed, unlike similar movements in other European countries that regularly held public rallies, the ONR-Falanga held only two such gatherings, in 1934 and 1937, both of which were quickly broken up by the police.

For a time the movement became associated with the Camp of National Unity (OZN) as Colonel Adam Koc, impressed by the organisation of the ONR-Falanga, placed Piasecki in charge of the OZN youth group. Koc called for the creation of a one-party state and hoped to use the youth movement to ensure this although his pronouncements upset many pro-government moderates. As such, Koc was removed from the leadership of the OZN in 1938 and replaced by General Stanisław Skwarczyński who quickly severed any ties to the ONR-Falanga.

Disappearance
As a Polish nationalist movement the RNR-Falanga opposed the German occupation of Poland after the 1939 invasion, and thus was quickly subsumed by the Konfederacja Narodu, a group within the Polish resistance that retained certain far right views.

However, following the establishment of a communist government in 1945, Piasecki was allowed to lead the PAX Association, a supposedly Catholic organisation that was in fact a front group of the NKVD which aimed to promote the new communist regime to Poland's Catholics whilst turning them away from the Vatican.

ABC
The ONR-ABC was the second splinter group besides Falanga founded by Henryk Rossman.

Modern incarnation (1993)

Ideology
The modern National Radical Camp, like its predecessors, is fascist. The United Nations Committee for the Elimination of Racial Discrimination considers the organization a fascist group promoting racial and national hatred and has called on Poland to de-legalize it by enforcing its constitutional ban on such groups. In 2021, Poland’s Supreme Court ruled that the National Radical Camp could be called fascist.    

The party flag of the organization was included in the police handbook as an explicitly racist symbol and has made usage of the Celtic Cross, an old symbol appropriated by neo-Nazis. The Interior Ministry subsequently pulled the book from circulation after a complaint from MP Adam Andruszkiewicz.

In 2015, an ONR demonstration ended with the burning of an effigy of an ultra-Orthodox Jew. Proceedings were opened for violating laws against "insulting people based on religion, ethnicity, race or nationality".

In 2019, the Lublin-Południe District Prosecutor's Office opened proceedings against ONR for "public propagation of a totalitarian regime" after they published a Tweet celebrating Belgian fascist and SS officer Léon Degrelle.

Marches

Myślenice rallies
ONR attracted publicity in 2005, 2007, 2008 and 2009 for unauthorized marches during the anniversary of the anti-Jewish riot in Myślenice in 1936. In 2005 the group had a couple of hundred members.

An illegal rally held on June 30, 2007 resulted in a court case, in which the ONR leader, Wojciech Mazurkiewicz, was acquitted only because the magistrate warning was issued too late, according to the presiding judge. The 2008 rally led by the same ONR leader was taped by police with the intention of sharing the video with the local prosecutors office according to Lesser Poland Police.

ONR members at a 2008 rally in Myślenice made a Roman salute before disbanding. When questioned by reporters at the scene, the ONR leader claimed it is different from the Nazi salute.

Independence Day marches

The association has also been known as initiators of marches during the National Independence Day of Poland. One of them (in Warsaw), as a co-initiative of several different nationalist movements in 2010, evolved in 2012 into one of the biggest events during the day, which now attracts a more diverse community. Since 2012, it has been organized by a registered association which was founded and is co-chaired by ONR.

On 11 November 2017, 60,000 people marched in an Independence Day celebration procession co-organized by the ONR along with the All-Polish Youth. People from the group "Black Block", which consisted of associations "Niklot" and "Szturmowcy", carried banners that read "White Europe", "Europe Will Be White" and "Clean Blood, Sober mind - sXe. There were also others who were chanting "Death to enemies of the homeland" and "Catholic Poland, not secular". Foreign guests included self-identified Italian fascist Roberto Fiore, Slovak neo-Nazi MP Milan Mazurek, and several members of Hungary's far-right Jobbik party. American white supremacist Richard Spencer planned to speak at the march, but was banned from doing so, with the Ministry announcing in a later statement that Spencer's views were "in conflict with the legal order of Poland". The march was cited in a European Parliament resolution that called for member states to act decisively against far-right extremism.    

For the march in 2018, the neo-fascist party Forza Nuova was invited. Far-right activists and groups from Hungary, Estonia, Belarus, Spain, Italy, the Netherlands, USA and Portugal joined the event in 2021 and formed the “Nationalistic Column” with Polish far-right organizations and movements, including but not limited to: “Trzecia Droga”, “Szturmowcy”, Autonomiczni Nacjonaliści, the National Radical Camp (ONR), All-Polish Youth, National Rebirth of Poland (NOP).

See also
 Falange
 Camp of Great Poland
 Confederation of the Nation
 Nara (disambiguation)
 National Movement (Poland)
 ONR (disambiguation)
 Camp of National Unity (Obóz Zjednoczenia Narodowego)

References

Further reading

External links
 Official website

1935 establishments in Poland
1939 disestablishments in Poland
Defunct political parties in Poland
Falangist parties
Far-right political parties in Poland
Polish nationalist parties
Polish nationalism
Political parties disestablished in 1939
Political parties established in 1935
National radicalism
1934 disestablishments in Poland
1934 establishments in Poland
Anti-communism in Poland
Anti-communist parties
Antisemitism in Europe
Antisemitism in Poland
Right-wing antisemitism
Formerly banned far-right parties
Nationalist parties in Poland
Neo-Nazism in Poland
Political parties disestablished in 1934
Political parties established in 1934
Political parties established in 1993
1993 establishments in Poland